Susan Lesley Griffiths MS (born 1960), known as Lesley Griffiths, is a Welsh Labour politician serving as Trefnydd of the Senedd since 2021. She worked as a secretary to John Marek and the constituency assistant to Ian Lucas, successive Members of Parliament for Wrexham, and was elected to the Senedd from the Wrexham constituency in 2007. She has held a number of cabinet positions in the Welsh Government. In December 2009 she was appointed Deputy Minister for Science, Innovation and Skills.

In 2011, she was appointed Minister for Health and Social Services. She was then appointed Minister for Local Government and Government Business in March 2013. In September 2014 she was appointed Minister for Communities and Tackling Poverty. Following the 2016 election, she was appointed Cabinet Secretary for Environment and Rural Affairs following her own re-election. She retained her post in a Welsh Government Cabinet reshuffle in November 2017, but with a revised portfolio of Energy, Planning, and Rural Affairs with Hannah Blythyn becoming her Deputy Minister for the Environment.

2003 campaign
Griffiths was the secretary of John Marek, who represented Wrexham as a Labour member of the Welsh Assembly. However, in 2003 Marek was de-selected by the local party and Griffiths was selected in his place. There followed a Labour Party inquiry, in which Marek was first contacted by telephone half an hour before the result was announced, and his de-selection was upheld. Marek then decided to fight to retain his seat as an Independent, and Griffiths struggled during the campaign; an early poll showed Marek beating her by 40% to 29%. In the event, on polling day Marek beat Griffiths by 973 votes.

Subsequent elections
Having been a supporter of Wrexham Football Club, Griffiths was elected to the board of the Wrexham Supporters Trust. In December 2005 she was selected again as Labour candidate for the Wrexham constituency for the 2007 Assembly elections. She benefited from high-profile support as the party saw an opportunity to recapture the seat; John Marek appealed to the large Polish immigrant population by translating his election material into Polish. However, Griffiths increased her numerical vote while Marek's vote fell, and she won the seat by 1,250.

In 2011, Griffiths faced Marek for a third time, though by now Marek had joined the Conservatives. Both of them saw increases in their votes compared to 2007, but Griffiths held the seat with an increased majority of 3,337. Griffiths was re-selected to defend her seat at the 2016 election., and retained it with a reduced majority of 1,325 over the Conservative candidate.

Ministerial responsibility

Griffiths was appointed Deputy Minister for Science, Innovation and Skills in December 2009. After the 2011 election, she was promoted to the Minister for Health and Social Services, a post she held until March 2013 when she was appointed Minister for Local Government and Government Business. In September 2014 she was appointed Minister for Communities and Tackling Poverty. She was appointed Cabinet Secretary for Environment and Rural Affairs following re-election in May 2016, before being named in her current role of Cabinet Secretary for Energy, Planning, and Rural Affairs in November 2017.

In October 2018 Griffiths used her ministerial office to overturn the decision of a planning inspector to refuse a proposed wind farm near Llandrindod Wells. In November the Campaign for the Protection of Rural Wales announced that it was challenging this in the High Court.

References

External links
Personal website

Offices held

1960 births
Living people
Welsh Labour members of the Senedd
Wales AMs 2007–2011
Wales AMs 2011–2016
Wales MSs 2016–2021
Wales MSs 2021–2026
Female members of the Senedd